Force of Nature is the debut studio album by American R&B recording artist Tank. It was released on March 13, 2001 by Blackground Records. The album debuted atop the US Billboard Top R&B/Hip-Hop Albums chart and debuted at number seven on the US Billboard 200.

Critical reception

Steve Huey of AllMusic rated Force of Nature three out of five stars. He found that "there doesn't seem to be much here that will truly separate Tank from the rest of an already crowded R&B pack, but Force of Nature is well-crafted enough for its Top Ten status to make sense." Entertainment Weeklys Evan Serpick compared Tank's music on Force of Nature with singer D'Angelo: "But while D'Angelo — with his jazz riffs and vocal subtlety — oozes sexy cool, Tank steamrolls listeners with his leaden beats and showy Mariah-esque gyrations."

Commercial performance
Force of Nature debuted and peaked at number 7 on the US Billboard 200 in the week of March 31, 2001, selling 97,000 copies in its first week. It also became Tank's first album to debut at number one on the Top R&B/Hip-Hop Albums chart. Force of Nature has been certified gold by the Recording Industry Association of America (RIAA). By February 2016, it had sold 775,000 copies in United States.

Track listing

Personnel 
Credits for Force of Nature adapted from liner notes.

 Tank – Primary Artist, Vocals 
 Tank – Track Performer 
 Jamie Foxx – Background Vocals 
 Stevie Blacke – Guitar, Strings 
 Lorenzo Pryer – Keyboards 
 J. Dub – Multi Instruments 
 Caviar – Producer, Percussion, Keyboards 
 Budda – Keyboards 
 Digital Black – Vocals 
 Eric Seats – Multi Instruments 
 Overdose – Producer 
 Paul Riser – Engineer, String Arrangements 
 Scott Wolfe – Engineer 
 Stewart – Producer 
 Bob Tucker – Engineer 
 Carlos Warlick – Engineer 
 Barry Hankerson – Executive Producer 
 Jomo Hankerson – Executive Producer 
 Joe Yannece – Mastering 
 Storm Jefferson – Engineer 
 J. Dub – Programming, Producer 
 Michael Conrader – Engineer 
 Scotty Beats – Engineer 
 Eric Pitts – Engineer 
 Budda – Producer, Engineer, Remixing, Keyboards, Mixing
 Wayne Allison – Engineer 
 S.A. Anderson – Composer
 Gabe Chiesa – Mixing
 K. Cross – Composer
 Peter DiRado – Assistant Engineer
 Kevin Jackson – Mixing
 Acar S. Key – Mixing
 W. Prince Moore – Composer
 Durrell Babbs – Composer
 Jonathan Mannion – Photography

Charts

Weekly charts

Year-end charts

Certifications and sales

|}

Release history

References

2001 albums
Tank (American singer) albums
Albums produced by Bud'da